The Haacke HFM-2 was a German two cylinder flat engine built in the early 1920s.

Variants 
From Flight
 HFM-2
 HFM-2a; as HFM-2 apart from  bore

Applications 
 Albatros L.66
 Dietrich-Gobiet DP.VII
 Działowski D.K.D.1
 Dobi-I
 Gabriel P 5
 Karhu 3
 Mayenberger amphibian
 Rieseler R.I
 Rieseler R.II
 Rieseler R.III
 Silesia S-3
 Silesia S-4
 Udet U.1
 Udet U.2

Engines on display 
Finnish Airforce Museum

Specifications (HFM-2)

See also

References 

1920s aircraft piston engines